Donald Onchiri (born 15 December 1964) is a former Kenyan sprinter who competed in the men's 100m competition at the 1996 Summer Olympics. He recorded a 10.66, not enough to qualify for the next round past the heats. His personal best is 10.30, set the same year.

References

1964 births
Kenyan male sprinters
Athletes (track and field) at the 1996 Summer Olympics
Olympic athletes of Kenya
Living people